Hawler Medical University (Kurdish: Zankoy Hewlêrî Pizîşkî / زانكۆی هه‌ولێری پزیشكی) is located in Erbil, capital of the Arbil Governorate in Iraqi Kurdistan .

Hawler Medical University

Hawler Medical University is an Iraqi Kurdistan Region public university located in Erbil. It was established in 2005 by the Iraqi Kurdistan Regional Government's Council of Ministers. The university was founded to house the medical group colleges that were previously part of the Salahaddin University-Erbil. The overall goal of Hawler Medical University's formation was to strengthen medical education in the Kurdistan region, as well as to have better and more effective college management. Hawler Medical University, Iraq's first medical group of a university, offers undergraduate and postgraduate education in a variety of medical and health fields. The university currently encompasses five colleges: College of Medicine, College of Dentistry, College of Pharmacy, College of Nursing, and College of Health Sciences, in addition to a Center for Medical Researches. It has two main campuses, both of them are in Erbil.

1. The University Administration

The University Council is the university's highest decision-making body. The university's council meets on a regular basis to debate the university's overall strategy and aims, make decisions on topics under its jurisdiction, and make recommendations to the Ministry of Higher Education and Scientific Research. The University Council sessions are led by the president of the university.

President: Prof. Dr. Nooraddin Ismail Alla Werdi
 
Vice President for Scientific Affairs: Asst. Prof. Dr. Zhian Dezayee

Vice President for Administrative and Financial Affairs: Asst. Prof. Dr.  Hawri M. Baker

Vice President for Students Affairs:  Asst. Prof. Dr. Karwan M-Amen

2. Colleges of Hawler Medical University

2.1 College of Medicine
 
Hawler Medical University's College of Medicine is the oldest medical school in Iraq's Kurdistan region. It began as a part of Sulaimaniyah University in 1977, and in 1981, it became one of Salahaddin University's colleges. In 2005, Hawler Medical University took over the administration of the College.  The College of Medicine is composed of the following departments:

Department of Medicine

Department of Obstetrics and Gynecology

Department of Psychiatry

Department of Pediatrics

Department of Surgery

Department of Basic Sciences

Department of Community Medicine

2.2 College of Dentistry

College of Dentistry was established in 1995 at Salahaddin University-Erbil. After that, its management changed to Hawler Medical University in 2005. The college has seven departments: 

Department of Conservative Dentistry

Department of Oral and Maxillofacial Surgery

Department of Periodontology

Department of Pedodontics, Orthodontics and Preventive
Dentistry (POP)

Department of Prosthodontics

Department of Basic Sciences

Department of Oral Diagnosis and Oral Medicine

2.3 College of Pharmacy 

The College of Pharmacy was the first pharmacy school founded in Iraq's Kurdistan region. The university of Salahaddin-Erbil established the college in 1997. After that, the management is changed to Hawler Medical University. The college has five departments:

Department of Pharmacognosy

Department of Pharmaceutical Chemistry

Department of Pharmacology

Department of Phrmaceutics

Department of Clinical Analysis

2.4 College of Nursing 

This college was established in 2002 and currently it has two departments:

Department of Nursing

Department of Midwifery

2.5 College of Health Sciences 
 
The College of Health Sciences' mission is to educate and develop highly competent and trained medical laboratory technologists for use in the healthcare system. College of Health Sciences, which was formed in 2012. Currently it has three departments and two additional department are planned to be opened for students in 2022-2023. 

Department of Medical Microbiology

Department of Clinical Biochemistry

Department of Physiotherapy

3. The centers of Hawler Medical University

3.1 Medical Research Center

Hawler Medical University's Medical Research Center was established in 2008. The Medical Research Center is a non-profit government organization. The center aspires to be a ground-breaking research facility in Erbil and the Kurdistan region.

3.2 Career Development Center

The HMU Career Development Center will work to develop talented and active students as well as engage them with the private sector in order to increase their prospects of finding work in future. 

3.3 Women's Health Center

The Center for Research and Education in Women's Health (CREWH) was founded as a product of a US embassy-funded IREX initiative in partnership with the State University of New York at Albany.

3.4 Pedagogy Center

The goal of this center is to boost faculty research capabilities. Increasing the effectiveness of educational methods. Improving the faculty's information and communication technology (ICT).  Develop Current assessment instruments and strategies for their usage. And to create an environment that is conducive to e-learning and blended learning.

4. Admission 

Local high school graduates can apply to Hawler Medical University’s Bachelor degree through Ministry of Higher Education and Scientific Research’s Online Central Student Board Application System (AKA Zankoline). Zankoline website accept application at the end of each academic year. International students are advised to contact admission office before their application at info@hmu.edu.krd. 

5. Libraries 

There are six libraries that serves books and post graduate thesis and dissertations across Hawler Medical University’s two campuses, those are:

Library of the College of Medicine

Library of the College of Dentistry

Library of the College of Pharmacy

Library of the College of Nursing

Library of the College of Health Sciences

Library of the Medical Research Center  

6. Scientific Journals 

Hawler Medical University is issues of journals are:
         
Zanco Journal of Medical Sciences

Erbil Dental Journal

Erbil Journal of Nursing and Midwifery

Reference:
https://hmu.edu.krd/

References

Buildings and structures in Erbil
Medical schools in Iraq
Universities in Kurdistan Region (Iraq)
Educational institutions established in 2005
2005 establishments in Iraqi Kurdistan

https://hmu.edu.krd/